The 1915 Brown Bears football team was an American football team that represented Brown University as an independent during the 1915 college football season. In its 14th season under head coach Edward N. Robinson, Brown compiled a 5–3–1 record in the regular season, lost to Washington State in the second Rose Bowl game, and outscored all opponents by a total of 166 to 46. The team played its home games at Andrews Field in Providence, Rhode Island. Notable players included Fritz Pollard, Zach Siebel, and Wallace Wade.

Schedule

References

Brown
Brown Bears football seasons
Brown Bears football